The 1965–66 Kansas Jayhawks men's basketball team represented the University of Kansas during the 1965–66 NCAA University Division men's basketball season. Led by second-year head coach Ted Owens, the fourth-ranked Jayhawks won the Big Eight Conference title, and the automatic berth in the 22-team NCAA tournament. 

Kansas' Elite Eight double-overtime loss to eventual champion Texas Western, (now UTEP), was featured in the 2006 film Glory Road.

Roster
Walt Wesley
Al Lopes
Del Lewis
Ron Franz
Rodger Bohnenstiehl
Bob Wilson
Riney Lochmann
Jo Jo White
Pat Davis
Fred Chana
John Carter

Schedule

|-
!colspan=12 style=| Regular Season

|-
!colspan=12 style=| NCAA Tournament

References

Kansas Jayhawks men's basketball seasons
Kansas
Kansas
Kansas
Kansas